Basnet may refer to:

Surnames, clan and peoples 
Basnet, Nepalese surname
Basnyat family, Nepalese family
List of people with surname Basnet
Shreepali Basnyat, clan of Basnyat

Location 
Basnettville, West Virginia